The Tiberian-Julian dynasy was the third and last dynasty of the kingdom of Cimmerian Bosporan. The members of it bare the names Tiberius Julius before their names, on behalf of the Roman Emperor Tiberius Julius. The first member of the family is Tiberius Julius Aspurgus.

History
The Mithridatic dynasty ruled the kingdom of Bosporus, with its last member being Dynamis. Because of the Romans, the Kingdom of Pontus was reduced to that of Bosporus (today Kerch Strait) and it was a client kingdom to Rome. Dynamis had three husbands, acting as kings. Maybe from her first husband Asander, she had a son Aspurgus, whom he accepter the Roman Senate, then Augustus and later his son Tiberius Julius. Aspurgus received the roman citizenship, and the praenomen Tiberius Julius; all his descendants keep this praenomen. He married Gepaepyris, daughter of Cotys III (Sapaean) king of Thrace and some of his descendants had thracian royal names like Cotys, Rhescouporis and Roemetalces.

Gepaepyris was daughter of Antonia Tryphaena (2nd cousin of Caligula), daughter of Pythodorida of Pontus (cousin of Claudius and 2nd cousin of Nero), which in turn was daughter of Antonia Prima (nice of Augustus), daughter of the triumvir Mark Antony. The dynasty had strong family relations to Roman Emperors, and the kingdom lasted longer than any other Hellenistic one. The dynasty lasted as for 12 generations and had 22 kings, much more than the previous three dynasties in the kingdom of Bosporus. The last king died on 342 AD, when Constantius II was Emperor. Then the Huns captured the kingdom, after that Utigurs and later Goths. The kingdom came to Roman Empire under Justinian II.

Tiberian-Julian dynasty: a possible family tree

See also
 Bosporan Kingdom
 Roman Crimea
 Cimmerian Bosporus

References

See also
 Bosporan Kingdom

Further reading
Overview

Social, economic and cultural

Political and military

Numismatic
 Rare and Unique Coins of Bosporan Kingdom. Bulletin of the Odesa Numismatics Museum. Issues 7,8,9. 2001. Odesa. Ukraine.

Dynasty genealogy
Hellenistic Pontus
Bosporan Kingdom
Former monarchies of Europe
Roman client kingdoms
Former kingdoms
Greek colonies in Crimea